Antonio Kaufusi (born 27 November 1984) is a former professional rugby league footballer. An Australia and Tonga international and Queensland State of Origin representative , he played for the Canterbury-Bankstown Bulldogs, Melbourne Storm, North Queensland Cowboys and the Newcastle Knights in the NRL, and the London Broncos, Huddersfield Giants and the Bradford Bulls in the Super League.

Background
Kaufusi was born in Matahau, Tonga. His junior club was Brothers in Bundaberg and he played rugby union for Nudgee College in Brisbane in 2002.

Playing career

Melbourne Storm
Kaufusi made his first-grade début in round 22 against the Bulldogs on 10 August 2003.

In 2006 Kaufusi was called up to the Australian tri-nations squad after Reni Maitua received an ankle injury in the first test against New Zealand. He played at prop forward in his first Grand Final in 2006, when the Storm were defeated by the Brisbane Broncos, 15–8.

He played State of Origin for Queensland, making his début in game one 2007.

A serious knee injury prevented Kaufusi from participating in the Storm's victorious 2007 premiership winning team. He played in the 2008 NRL Grand Final defeat by Manly.

He was named in the Tonga squad for the 2008 Rugby League World Cup.

Cowboys
In 2009, the North Queensland Cowboys signed Kaufusi on a large contract. His stint with the Cowboys was short though, being released a year later.

Knights
On 25 June 2010, Kaufusi was released from his contract with the North Queensland Cowboys to join the Newcastle Knights for the rest of 2010 and a further two years. He made a winning début for the Knights in round 18 against the Cronulla-Sutherland Sharks.

London Broncos
On 18 August 2011, Kaufusi signed a 3-year deal with the London Broncos in the Super League after the 2012 Knights coach, Wayne Bennett, released him from his contract a year early.

Huddersfield Giants
Kaufusi played for Huddersfield Giants in 2014.

Bradford Bulls
On 2 May 2014, Kaufusi was loaned to Bradford Bulls for the rest of the 2014 season.

Canterbury-Bankstown Bulldogs
On 13 November 2014, Kaufusi signed a 2-year contract with the Canterbury-Bankstown Bulldogs starting in 2015, to return to Australia.

References

External links
2011 Newcastle Knights profile
NRL profile
Players to watch – Antonio Kaufusi (Tonga)

1984 births
Tongan rugby league players
Australia national rugby league team players
Tonga national rugby league team players
London Broncos players
Newcastle Knights players
North Queensland Cowboys players
Melbourne Storm players
Canterbury-Bankstown Bulldogs players
Queensland Rugby League State of Origin players
Exiles rugby league team players
Rugby league props
Tongan emigrants to Australia
Tongan expatriate rugby league players
Expatriate rugby league players in England
Tongan expatriate sportspeople in England
Living people
People from Tongatapu